PagSeguro is a financial services and digital payments company based in São Paulo, Brazil and incorporated
in the Grand Cayman, Cayman Islands. Founded in 2006, the company primarily offers payment processing software for e-commerce websites and mobile applications, and point of sale terminals. It has been traded as a public company on the New York Stock Exchange since January 2018 with the ticker symbol PAGS. 

PagSeguro is part of Universo Online (UOL group), which, according to Ibope Nielsen Online, is Brazil's largest Internet portal, with more than 50 million unique visitors and 6.7 billion page views every month. In 2015, it was recognized as the "Best Payment Method" by the Congresso Afiliados Brasil (Brazil Affiliates Congress).

History
In 2006, UOL formed PagSeguro to be the company's financial services platform. In January of the following year, UOL acquired BrPay, a Brazilian electronic payment company that was incorporated into PagSeguro 6 months later.

In November 2008, PagSeguro was elected the best website of the year in the Electronic Commerce category by Info Exame readers. 
 Also in 2008, it received the INFO Award, held by Editora Abril, in the same category: Electronic Commerce.

By 2010, PagSeguro had more than 12 million registered users. In 2012, it partnered with Horus, an electronic payment means fraud prevention company.

In 2012, it partnered with Nokia to process payments via Near Field Communication (NFC), a technology that enables the safe data transmission by approaching two cell phones. PagSeguro was the first company to implement NFC technology in Brazil.

In 2013, PagSeguro launched the MINI reader, a credit and debit card reader designed to enable payments via mobile applications. In that same year, it partnered with Cartão Mais! and iPAGARE Magento. Retailers that have a Magento store with the iPAGARE technology can use PagSeguro at checkout.

PagSeguro received the PCI-DSS (Payment Card Industry Data Security Standards) certification in 2013.

Operations 
PagSeguro is an e-commerce company that intermediates payment between sellers and buyers by offering a billing option via email for traders who do not have a site or a well-structured e-commerce and it has agreements with several banking institutions so that sellers can offer buyers different payment methods. These banking institutions receive the payment and transfer it to the seller after making sure that there was no fraud in the operation. The service offers over 25 payment methods.

For purchases in which the customer neither receives the product, nor does it as agreed, a dispute (claim) can be started. PagSeguro mediates the dispute, in order to help the buyer to receive either the product or the money back, as well as to help the seller to have the transaction value refunded or to return it to the buyer.

In May 2016, PagSeguro launched the Split Payment, a tool that acts on transactions commissioning models. The tool was released in VTEX Day, the largest multi-channel retail event in Latin America, in which PagSeguro was also the master sponsor.

Machines and readers 
PagSeguro launched the credit card reader for credit sales with up to 12 installments, in 2013.

In September 2014, it launched the Debit and Credit Reader MINI, a card reader designed for small businesses. At the end of that year, it launched Moderninha, a machine for card operations, which does not request a cell phone and comes with a chip and an internet data plan included.

In June 2016, PagSeguro launched "Moderninha Wifi" and in October of that year, it launched the "Moderninha Pro".

Cards 
In August 2015 the company released a prepaid card with focus on the microentrepreneur, with chip and under MasterCard brand.

See also
 Universo Online

References

Financial services companies of Brazil
Grupo Folha
2018 initial public offerings
Companies listed on the New York Stock Exchange